Samin Gómez Briceno (born February 4, 1992 in Maracay) is a racing driver from Venezuela. She has raced in karting and several formulae.

Career

Karting
Samin Gómez started racing at the age of seven, racing in the Panamerican Championship, a series supported by the Commission Internationale de Karting (CIK) and the Fédération Internationale de l'Automobile (FIA). She moved to Europe for the 2007 season, taking part in the Formula Kart France series.

Asian Formula Renault
Starting in 2008, Gómez moved to single-seat open-wheel cars, making several guest appearances in the Asian Formula Renault Challenge throughout 2008 before moving onto a larger programme for the 2009 season. She contested the full 2010 season with Top Speed Racing, finishing third overall and taking three podium finishes at the Zhuhai International Circuit.

Formula Pilota China
In 2011, Gómez competed part-time in the Formula Pilota China series, replacing Robert Visoiu at Jenzer Motorsport. Gómez finished in the points in each of the six races she contested, including a podium finish at the Sepang International Circuit.

Formula Abarth
Gómez returned to Europe in 2011, continuing her association with Jenzer Motorsport in the Italian Formula Abarth championship, as well as making several guest appearances for EuroInternational. She contested the full season in 2012, finishing seventh overall with two podium finishes.

GP3 Series
Samin Gómez made her GP3 Series debut in 2013, driving once again for Jenzer Motorsport.

W Series
In 2019, Gómez attempted to qualify for a W Series, a women-only Formula 3 championship, but failed to progress beyond the evaluation day.

Racing record

Career summary

Complete GP3 Series results
(key) (Races in bold indicate pole position) (Races in italics indicate fastest lap)

Complete Auto GP results
(key)

References

External links
 

1992 births
Living people
Venezuelan racing drivers
Sportspeople from Maracay
Female racing drivers
Formula Abarth drivers
Formula Masters China drivers
GP3 Series drivers
Auto GP drivers
Jenzer Motorsport drivers
Campos Racing drivers
EuroInternational drivers